Animal trypanosomiasis, also known as nagana and nagana pest, or sleeping sickness, is a disease of vertebrates. The disease is caused by trypanosomes of several species in the genus Trypanosoma such as Trypanosoma brucei. Trypanosoma vivax causes nagana mainly in West Africa, although it has spread to South America. The trypanosomes infect the blood of the vertebrate host, causing fever, weakness, and lethargy, which lead to weight loss and anemia; in some animals the disease is fatal unless treated. The trypanosomes are transmitted by tsetse flies.

An interesting feature is the remarkable tolerance to nagana pathology shown by some breeds of cattle, notably the N'Dama – a West African Bos taurus breed. This contrasts with the susceptibility shown by East African Bos indicus cattle such as the zebu.

Transmission
Most trypanosomes develop in tsetse flies (Glossina spp.), its biological vector, in about one to a few weeks. When an infected tsetse fly bites an animal, the parasites are transmitted through its saliva. It can also be spread by fomites such as surgical instruments, needles, and syringes. The most important vectors are thought to be horseflies (Tabanidae spp.) and stable flies (Stomoxys spp.). 

The immune response of animals may be unable to eliminate trypanosomes completely, and the host may become an inapparent carrier. These inapparent infections can be reactivated if the animal is stressed. Transplacental transmission can also occur.

Signs and symptoms
The incubation period ranges from 4 days to approximately 8 weeks. The infection leads to significant weight loss and anemia. Various symptoms are observed, including fever, oedema, adenitis, dermatitis and nervous disorders. The disease cannot be diagnosed with certainty except physically detecting parasites by blood microscopic examination or various serological reactions.

Vectors

Diagnosis 
The diagnosis of African animal trypanosomiasis encompasses mainly the identification of the trypanosoma parasite when viewed under a microscope using a sample of blood (primarily) or lymph fluid (especially T.vivax) from an infected animal. Other techniques for detecting the parasite apart from direct microscopy include concentration techniques and animal inoculation. To identify trypanosomes or treat trypanosomiasis, a variety of diagnostic techniques are available. The sensitivity and specificity of current diagnostic tests, as well as how simple and expensive they are to use, vary. The selection of one or more specific tests is influenced by epidemiologically appropriate diagnostic needs, equipment and skill availability, and economic criteria. The majority of parasitological methods, with the exception of the thick blood film, can quickly identify live trypanosomes. It is expected that these procedures are 100% specific. Even though their sensitivity is far from adequate, they are regarded as the gold standard in the absence of more sensitive tests that are also similarly specific.

Thick blood films (TBFs)

TBFs are created by spreading a tiny drop of blood (between 10 and 20 l) on a glass slide to roughly four times its original surface area. After extensive drying, the slides can be dyed and examined under a 1000x magnification. Giemsa-based staining takes around 30 minutes to complete for thick film preparations. Because no centrifuge is used, electricity is not always required. It can be difficult to identify trypanosomes, which are usually distorted in this preparation, and it takes a lot of skill and experience. Results depend on the proficiency of the lab worker and the quality of the reagents. According to several research, the TBF's sensitivity ranges from 259 to 100%.

Lymph node aspirate (LNA) 

A posteriorly enlarged cervical lymph node is pierced with a needle for LNA examination, and the fluid is seen at a magnification of 400x. Both reagents and electricity are not needed for this test. A mobile team's typical activity may involve the examination of several individual animal in a single day. Most frequently, LNA is used in the field as a result of its ease of use and low cost, but a screening test should also come before it because enlarged cervical lymph nodes are not only a sign of African trypanosomiasis but also of other tropical diseases like leishmaniasis, tuberculosis, malaria, and toxoplasmosis. The quantity of blood analyzed and the degree of parasitemia have a significant impact on the likelihood of finding trypanosomes in a sample from an infected animal. The volume of blood tested with direct examination techniques is small  (2-10 l), and parasite counts in the blood of an infected animal are sometimes extremely low. These two elements together lower the sensitivity of direct examination methods. By concentrating the trypanosomes and examining larger volumes of blood, one can increase sensitivity. The hematocrit centrifuge technique (HCT), among these techniques, is the traditional and most reliable reference diagnostic test for identification of live trypanosomes.

Mini hematocrit centrifugation technique (mHCT) 

About 50–70 ml of blood may be collected in a capillary tube, and after centrifugation, the white blood cell zone between the plasma and the erythrocytes is where living trypanosomes are concentrated. The observed sensitivity ranges from 44.3% to 93.0% when employing four to eight capillary tubes.This method is less complicated than other tests, but it still needs a hematocrit centrifuge, power, and skilled lab personnel.

For the diagnosis of animal trypanosomosis, a number of antibody detection methods have been developed, with varying degrees of sensitivity and specificity. It is hoped that the discovery of the main trypanosome antigens and their manufacture as synthetic peptides or recombinant molecules would result in the creation of novel tests based on the usage of specific molecules. Thus, it may be conceivable to enhance the specificity of serological tests in the future to enable the detection of species-specific antibodies and to obtain a high degree of standardization that is now not attainable through the use of complete parasite extracts. As an alternative, developing methods for producing blood stages of different Trypanosoma species in vitro is very promising because it will enable the production of standardized whole cell lysate soluble antigens, which ensure high sensitivity due to the wide array of native antigens they display. For the majority of the host species impacted by Nagana, ELISA-Trypanosoma congolense savannah, ELISA-Trypanosoma vivax, and ELISA-Trypanosoma brucei brucei are the most preferred techniques for detecting anti-trypanosome antibodies.

Antigen preparation via rodent inoculation 

Infected blood freshly obtained is given intraperitoneally to the lab animals in quantities ranging from 0.1 to 0.5 ml (depending on the size of the rodent). The likelihood of isolating the parasite will be significantly increased by artificially suppressing the recipient animals' immune systems by radiation therapy or medication therapy (cyclophosphamide 200 mg/kg). Three times a week, a drop of blood is taken from the rodent's tail tip. The wet blood film technique is best used to examine the blood. The signs of an infection usually appear after 3 - 10 days, although the rats must be monitored for at least one month.

Control measures 
If the outbreak is detected early, the organism can be destroyed by quarantines, movement controls, and the euthanasia of infected animals. Tsetse fly populations can be reduced or eliminated by traps, insecticides, and by treating infected animals with antiparasitic drugs. The tsetse habitat can be destroyed by alteration of vegetation. Some drugs can prevent trypanosomiasis, and are called prophylactic drugs. These are very effective in protecting animals during the times they are exposed to diseases. Historically, these drugs were not used properly, leading to some resistance.

Waterbuck, among other animals, produces chemical odours that repel tsetse flies. This has led to the development of collars that store and gradually release these chemicals, reducing tsetse attack and thus trypanosomiasis incidence for cattle wearing these collars.

Economic impact 
Although the loss of direct livestock products (meat, milk, and blood) is problematic, the greatest impact of livestock trypanosomiasis is the loss of crop productivity due to loss of the animals' draught power in the field.

References

Further reading 
 

Parasitology
Bovine diseases
Livestock
Microscopy